The League of Ireland Cup 2004 was the 31st staging of the League of Ireland Cup, which was won by Longford Town, the club's first victory in the competition.

The 2004 League Cup kicked off in May. It featured two teams representing the Kerry and Mayo Leagues plus the 10 teams from the Premier Division and the 12 from the First Division.  There was 24 teams drawn into eight groups of three.  Each team played the other two in their group. The winner of each group progressed to the quarter-finals.

Group stage
Matches played between 3 May and 18 May 2004.

Group 1

Group 2

Group 3

Group 4

Group 5

Group 6

Group 7

Group 8

Quarter-finals
Matches played between 14 June and 28 June 2004.

Semi-finals

Final

External links
2004 Season in Ireland on rsssf website

League of Ireland Cup seasons
3
Cup